Zawady may refer to:
Zawady, Białystok
Zawady, Poznań
Zawady, Kalisz County in Greater Poland Voivodeship (west-central Poland)
Zawady, Oborniki County in Greater Poland Voivodeship (west-central Poland)
Zawady, Ostrzeszów County in Greater Poland Voivodeship (west-central Poland)
Zawady, Pleszew County in Greater Poland Voivodeship (west-central Poland)
Zawady, Rawicz County in Greater Poland Voivodeship (west-central Poland)
Zawady, Bełchatów County in Łódź Voivodeship (central Poland)
Zawady, Brzeziny County in Łódź Voivodeship (central Poland)
Zawady, Kutno County in Łódź Voivodeship (central Poland)
Zawady, Łask County in Łódź Voivodeship (central Poland)
Zawady, Łowicz County in Łódź Voivodeship (central Poland)
Zawady, Poddębice County in Łódź Voivodeship (central Poland)
Zawady, Rawa County in Łódź Voivodeship (central Poland)
Zawady, Sieradz County in Łódź Voivodeship (central Poland)
Zawady, Skierniewice County in Łódź Voivodeship (central Poland)
Zawady, Gmina Rzeczyca in Łódź Voivodeship (central Poland)
Zawady, Lublin Voivodeship (east Poland)
Zawady, Grójec County in Masovian Voivodeship (east-central Poland)
Zawady, Gmina Dzierzgowo in Masovian Voivodeship (east-central Poland)
Zawady, Gmina Lipowiec Kościelny in Masovian Voivodeship (east-central Poland)
Zawady, Gmina Baranowo in Masovian Voivodeship (east-central Poland)
Zawady, Gmina Troszyn in Masovian Voivodeship (east-central Poland)
Zawady, Płońsk County in Masovian Voivodeship (east-central Poland)
Zawady, Przysucha County in Masovian Voivodeship (east-central Poland)
Zawady, Gmina Przesmyki in Masovian Voivodeship (east-central Poland)
Zawady, Gmina Zbuczyn in Masovian Voivodeship (east-central Poland)
Zawady, Gmina Ceranów in Masovian Voivodeship (east-central Poland)
Zawady, Gmina Repki in Masovian Voivodeship (east-central Poland)
Zawady, Warsaw West County in Masovian Voivodeship (east-central Poland)
Zawady, Węgrów County in Masovian Voivodeship (east-central Poland)
Zawady, Wołomin County in Masovian Voivodeship (east-central Poland)
Zawady, Gmina Turośń Kościelna in Podlaskie Voivodeship (north-east Poland)
Zawady, Gmina Zawady in Podlaskie Voivodeship (north-east Poland)
Zawady, Bielsk County in Podlaskie Voivodeship (north-east Poland)
Zawady, Łomża County in Podlaskie Voivodeship (north-east Poland)
Zawady, Silesian Voivodeship (south Poland)
Zawady, Gołdap County in Warmian-Masurian Voivodeship (north Poland)
Zawady, Nidzica County in Warmian-Masurian Voivodeship (north Poland)
Zawady, Olsztyn County in Warmian-Masurian Voivodeship (north Poland)
Zawady, Pisz County in Warmian-Masurian Voivodeship (north Poland)